Panoweaver is an image stitching app. It supports telephoto, normal, wide angle and fisheye lens images into full 360*180 spherical panoramic image. Panoweaver also supports exporting 360 panoramic images into Flash VR, QuickTime VR, Java-based VR tours and swf, and publish on Facebook.

The 'free trial version' of Panoweaver is fully functional but creates panoramas with embedded visible watermarks.

Panoweaver pro also includes HDR and tone mapping support.

List of features

See also
Hugin is an open source alternative also based on Panorama Tools

Further reading
Jacobs, Corinna - Interactive Panoramas: Techniques for Digital Panoramic Photography 
Andrews, Philip - 360 Degree Imaging: The Photographers Panoramic Virtual Reality Manual

References

External links

C (programming language) software
C++ software
Windows graphics-related software
MacOS graphics software
Photo stitching software
Software that uses wxWidgets
HDR tone mapping software